The North Korean women's national ice hockey team represents North Korea at the International Ice Hockey Federation's IIHF World Women's Championships. The women's national team was created in 1999 and is controlled by Ice Hockey Association of the DPR Korea. North Korea has 920 female players. The North Korean women's national team is ranked 25th in the world.

Tournament record

Olympic
The North Korean women's hockey team has never qualified itself for an Olympic tournament though North Korean players were part of a Unified Korea Team which participated at the 2018 Winter Olympics in South Korea.

World Championship
1999 – NR (2nd in Pool B Qualification Group B)
2000 – Finished 1st in Pool B Qualification (15th overall)
2001 – Finished 4th in Division I (12th overall)
2003 – Finished 6th in Division I (14th overall)
2004 – Finished 6th in Division I (15th overall, relegated to Division II)
2005 – Finished 4th in Division II (18th overall)
2007 – Finished 3rd in Division II (18th overall)
2008 – Finished 3rd in Division II (18th overall)
2009 – Finished 2nd in Division II (17th overall)
2011 – withdrawn. Relegated to Division III for the 2012 IIHF Women's World Championship
2012 – Finished 1st in Division IIA (21st overall, promoted to Division IB)
2013 – Finished 3rd in Division IB (17th overall)
2014 – Finished 5th in Division IB (19th overall)
2015 – Finished 6th in Division IB (20th overall, relegated to Division IIA)
2016 – Finished 4th in Division IIA (24th overall)
2017 – Finished 4th in Division IIA (24th overall)
2018 – Finished 3rd in Division IIA (24th overall)
2019 – Finished 5th in Division IIA (27th overall)
2020 – Cancelled due to the COVID-19 pandemic
2021 – Cancelled due to the COVID-19 pandemic
2022 – Withdrawn due to the COVID-19 pandemic

Asian Winter Games
2003 – Finished in 4th place
2007 – Finished in 4th place
2011 – Finished in 4th place

IIHF Challenge Cup of Asia
2010 – 3rd

All-time record against other nations
Last match update: 13 March 2022

References

External links
IIHF profile

Ice hockey
Korea, North
women